Patrick James Rogers (1 February 1900 – 22 March 1963) was an Irish politician and farmer.

He was first elected to Dáil Éireann at the 1933 general election as a National Centre Party Teachta Dála (TD) for the Leitrim–Sligo constituency. He was elected as a Fine Gael TD for the Sligo constituency at the 1937 general election. He was re-elected at the 1938, 1943 and 1944 general elections.

He lost his seat at the 1948 general election but was elected for the Sligo–Leitrim constituency at the 1951 general election. He lost his seat again at the 1954 general election but was re-elected at the 1957 general election. He did not contest the 1961 general election. He served on Sligo County Council for the Ballymote area from 1928 until his death in 1963.

References

1900 births
1963 deaths
National Centre Party (Ireland) TDs
Fine Gael TDs
Irish farmers
Local councillors in County Sligo
Members of the 8th Dáil
Members of the 9th Dáil
Members of the 10th Dáil
Members of the 11th Dáil
Members of the 12th Dáil
Members of the 14th Dáil
Members of the 16th Dáil